is an anime series adapted from the manga of the same title by Nisio Isin and Akira Akatsuki. The series follows Medaka Kurokami, Zenkichi Hitoyoshi, Kouki Akune and Mogana Kikaijima, who are the members of the student council, during their various adventures to honor suggestions presented by academy members in order to better the academy. Produced by Gainax and directed by Shouji Saeki, the anime series premiered on TV Tokyo on April 5, 2012, and ran for 12 episodes. The anime has been licensed in North America by Sentai Filmworks, who will release the anime in both digital and home video formats. The opening theme is "Happy Crazy Box", performed by Minami Kuribayashi. A second season, titled , aired from October 11 to December 27, 2012. The opening theme, "Believe", is once again performed by Minami Kuribayashi for the first 11 episodes and "Want to be winner!" is performed by Megumi Ogata for the final episode.

Episode list

Medaka Box

Medaka Box Abnormal

Notes

References

Nisio Isin
Medaka box